Jose Guerrero (born 1973) is an American serial killer and rapist who attacked four women, killing three of them, between 1995 and 1998 in Madera, California. In 2004, while serving a sentence for a DUI, he was charged with the murders based on DNA evidence. Tried and convicted in 2009, he was sentenced to death.

Murders 
It is believed Guerrero met all of his victims at C street in Madera, an area known for its high percentage of prostitution, though not all of his victims were prostitutes. Initially, it was believed that the cases were unrelated to each other until DNA tests in 2004. Guerrero was definitely linked to three murders and one attempted murder:

Julie Ann Woodley 
In the morning hours of April 23, 1995, a farmworker found the body of a woman in an orchard just south of Madera. Sheriff's deputies later arrived and confirmed the body to be Julie Ann Woodley, also known as Julie Ann McDonald. A native of Madera, Woodley was a 42-year-old mother of two, though her children did not live with her. She had last been seen alive the previous night about eight hours before her body was found on Madera's south side. An autopsy was conducted on her body, and the coroner stated that she had been raped, sodomized and shot.

Evelyn Estrada 
On November 28, 1995, 42-year-old Evelyn Estrada reported being kidnapped by a man with a grape knife. She said the man told her everything that he was going to do to her, but when they arrived in a remote location, Estrada was able to fight with the man. During the altercation, the man slashed her throat. She was able to escape and survive the encounter.

Sharlene Fowler 
After nearly three years, another rape-murder occurred on July 14, 1998. The body of 30-year-old Sharlene Fowler was found in an orchard. An autopsy concluded that Fowler had been strangled to death.

Tamara Hernandez 
In 1998, 22-year-old Tamara Jones Hernandez arrived in Madera to visit family, having come from Eureka, California. On the night of November 22, Hernandez left the family home to buy milk for the children. She never arrived home that night, and later that night her body was found face down in area near Road 23 1⁄2 and Avenue 15 1⁄2.

Arrest 
In 1999, Guerrero was arrested for drunk driving. He was later given a prison sentence which would have lasted him at least five years. During his incarceration at Wasco State Prison, Guerrero was overheard bragging about committing multiple violent crimes, including at least three murders. In 2004, shortly before his scheduled release from prison, Guerrero submitted a sample of his DNA to the state's crime lab. In October of that year, the DNA sample confirmed his responsibility in Hernandez' murder. Following this, he was arrested at his jail cell and later charged with the murder. He was extradited to Madera County, where the following year he was charged with the murders of Woodley and Fowler, along with the attempted murder of Estrada. He was linked to these crimes via DNA.

Trial and imprisonment 
Guerrero was ruled competent to trial in March 2009. He went to trial the following month; it was the most high-profile case to be prosecuted in Madera County since the 1976 Chowchilla kidnapping. The trial lasted ten days, and Guerrero was convicted of three counts of first-degree murder and one count of attempted murder. The victims' families stated that, while they were thankful that he was convicted, they did not want Guerrero to be sentenced to death. Estrada also stated that she did not believe he should be killed. In June 2009, Guerrero was sentenced to death. Guerrero was then transferred to San Quentin State Prison to await execution. In 2019, California governor Gavin Newsom imposed a moratorium which halted all scheduled all executions in the state, so as of today Guerrero is still on death row.

See also 
 List of death row inmates in the United States
 List of serial killers in the United States

References

External links 
 CDCR Inmate Information

1975 births
1995 murders in the United States
1998 murders in the United States
20th-century American criminals
American male criminals
American people convicted of murder
American prisoners sentenced to death
American rapists
American serial killers
Criminals from California
Living people
Male serial killers
People convicted of murder by California
Prisoners sentenced to death by California
Violence against women in the United States